

Studio albums

Collaboration studio albums

Compilation albums

Singles

DVD
 2009 : Discover the World: Live in Concert (DVD)

References

Pink Martini